Bugle was an electoral division of Cornwall in the United Kingdom which returned one member to sit on Cornwall Council between 2009 and 2021. It was abolished at the 2021 local elections, being divided between the new divisions of Roche and Bugle, Lostwithiel and Lanreath, and Penwithick and Boscoppa.

Councillors

Extent
Bugle represented the villages of Stenalees, Bugle and Luxulyan and the hamlets of Trethowel, Ruddlemoor, Carthew, Rosevear, Rosevean, Bowling Green, Lockengate, Bodwen, Bodiggo, Treskilling and Rosemelling. The division was nominally abolished during boundary changes at the 2013 election, but this had little effect on the ward. From 2009 to 2013, the division covered 3,120 hectares in total; after the boundary changes in 2013, it covered 3,830 hectares.

Election results

2017 election

2013 election

2009 election

References

Electoral divisions of Cornwall Council